The discography of American hip hop recording artist Project Pat consists of ten studio albums (one of which in collaboration with Nasty Mane), nineteen mixtapes, one compilation album and fourteen singles (including four as a featured artist).

Albums

Studio albums

Mixtapes

Compilation albums

Collaboration albums

Singles

As lead artist

As featured artist

Guest appearances

Notes

References

External links 
 Project Pat discography at AllMusic
 Project Pat on Apple Music
 Project Pat discography at Discogs
 Project Pat releases at MusicBrainz

Discographies of American artists
Hip hop discographies